Vakilabad (also Romanized as Vakīlābād) is a village in Sharifabad Rural District, Koshkuiyeh District, Rafsanjan County, Kerman Province, Iran. At the 2006 census, its population was 24, in 4 families.

References 

Populated places in Rafsanjan County